Pomerance is the name of:

 Bernard Pomerance (born 1940), US-American playwright and poet 
 Carl Pomerance (born 1944), US-American mathematician
 Murray Pomerance (born 1946), Canadian film scholar
 Rafe Pomerance Environmental Advocate in U.S. government and other NPO/NGOs

See also
Pomerants
Pomerantz